Hotel Washington, also known as the Washington Tower, is a historic hotel building located at Indianapolis, Indiana.  It was built in 1912, and is a 17-story, rectangular, Beaux-Arts style steel frame and masonry building.  It is three bays wide and consists of a three-story, limestone clad base, large Chicago style window openings on the fifth to 13th floors, and arched window openings on the 17th floor.  It is located next to the Lombard Building.  The building has housed a hotel, apartments, and offices.

It was listed on the National Register of Historic Places in 1980.  It is located in the Washington Street-Monument Circle Historic District.

References

External links

Individually listed contributing properties to historic districts on the National Register in Indiana
Hotel buildings on the National Register of Historic Places in Indiana
Beaux-Arts architecture in Indiana
Hotel buildings completed in 1912
Hotels in Indianapolis
National Register of Historic Places in Indianapolis
Chicago school architecture in Indiana